The Iran women's national under-20 football team represents Iran in international women's under-20 football in the AFC U-19 Women's Championship and the FIFA U-20 Women's World Cup. It is controlled by the Iranian Football Federation.

History
The women's under-20s qualified for the 2015 AFC U-19 Women's Championship for the first time after winning their group in qualification.

Team image

Nicknames
The Iran women's national under-20 football team has been known or nicknamed as the "Team Melli Javanane Zanan
(The Ladies Youth National Team)".

Results and fixtures

Previous matches

Forthcoming matches

Competitive record

AFC U-19 Women's Championship

See also
 Iran women's national football team
 Iran women's national under-17 football team
 Women's football in Iran

References

External links
 Federation website
 FIFA profile

under-20
under-20
Asian women's national under-20 association football teams